Rock United Presbyterian Church is a historic Presbyterian church located at Elkton, Cecil County, Maryland.  It is a rectangular building of uncoursed rubble stone construction, three bays wide by three deep, with a steeply pitched slate-clad gable roof. It was originally constructed in 1761, and remodeled to its current Victorian Gothic influenced appearance in 1872 and 1900.  Also on the property is a -story, stone Session House originally constructed in 1762 and a modern white stucco Church House constructed in 1953. The church is significant due to its association with the early Scotch-Irish immigrants to Maryland.

It was listed on the National Register of Historic Places in 1983.

References

External links
, including photo from 1980, at Maryland Historical Trust
Rock Presbyterian Church website

Elkton, Maryland
Presbyterian churches in Maryland
Churches in Cecil County, Maryland
Churches on the National Register of Historic Places in Maryland
Churches completed in 1900
Scotch-Irish American culture in Maryland
Scotch-Irish American history
19th-century Presbyterian church buildings in the United States
National Register of Historic Places in Cecil County, Maryland
1761 establishments in Maryland